Kendall Carly Browne (May 31, 1918 – January 26, 2018) was an American film and television actress and television host. Browne, whose professional career spanned decades, was best known for her film roles, including Dreamscape in 1984 and Pineapple Express in 2008, as well as television roles from the 1950s to 2000s including The Jack Benny Program, Beverly Hills, 90210, ER, CSI: Crime Scene Investigation, and My Name Is Earl.

Born in Pennsylvania on May 31, 1918, Browne began her career as a receptionist at the Zeppo Marx Talent Agency before seguing into acting and on-air work. In 1952, she was hired by CBS when the television network first launched. Browne then hosted Four Star Theater on KECA-TV, which is now present-day KABC-TV in Los Angeles.

Kendall Carly Browne died from natural causes at her home in Indio, California, on January 26, 2018, at the age of 99. She was survived by her sons, actor Bart Braverman, who is best known for his work on the ABC series Vegas, and television director and producer, Chuck Braverman. Her husband, Herb Braverman, a television producer, died in 1958.

Filmography

References

External links

1918 births
2018 deaths
American film actresses
American stage actresses
American television actresses
People from Indio, California
21st-century American women